Apedale Community Country Park is a  country park in the borough of Newcastle-under-Lyme, Staffordshire, England. The park is unusual for the area as it was previously as an opencast mine.

The area has a long history of mining, with the nearby former collieries at Silverdale and Holditch also having been redeveloped for other uses.

The park is considered by administration as a form of compensation to the residents of the area for the large amount of development that has taken place over recent years. The shallow mine at Holditch was redeveloped into a business park and industrial estate, which led to significant capital gains for Staffordshire County Council. The amelioration of the park was part paid for out of these receipts.

Within the park is the Apedale Heritage Centre. The adjoining Moseley Railway Trust is currently running the first phase of the  narrow gauge Apedale Valley Light Railway extending further into the parkland. There is a series of tracks, waymarked routes and self-guided trails.

The country park is also the home of Newcastle Countryside Project and is bordered by the communities of Silverdale, Chesterton, Knutton and Cross Heath.

References

External links
Staffordshire County Council
Moseley Railway Trust 
Apedale Heritage Centre

Country parks in Staffordshire
Tourist attractions in Staffordshire
Borough of Newcastle-under-Lyme